The 2018 United States Senate special election in Mississippi took place on November 6, 2018, to elect a United States senator from Mississippi. The election was held to fill the seat vacated by Senator Thad Cochran when he resigned from the Senate, effective April 1, 2018, due to health concerns. Republican governor Phil Bryant appointed Cindy Hyde-Smith to fill the vacancy created by Cochran's resignation. Hyde-Smith sought election to serve the balance of Cochran's term, which expired in January 2021.

On November 6, per Mississippi law, a nonpartisan top-two special general election took place on the same day as the regularly scheduled U.S. Senate election for the seat currently held by Roger Wicker. Party affiliations were not printed on the ballot.

Because no candidate gained a simple majority of the vote, a runoff between the top two candidates, Cindy Hyde-Smith and Mike Espy, was held on November 27, 2018, in which Hyde-Smith defeated Espy. Despite her reasonable margin of victory, Hyde-Smith significantly under-performed Mississippi's partisan lean, as well as Wicker's 20-point margin of victory, held concurrently with the first round of the special election, in which the GOP candidates won a combined total of 58% to the combined Democratic total of 42%.

The victory made Hyde-Smith the first woman ever elected to the United States Congress from Mississippi.

Candidates
 Note: Special elections in Mississippi are officially nonpartisan. The parties below identify which party label each candidate would have run under if given the option.

Declared
Tobey Bartee (Democratic Party), former Gautier city councilman
Mike Espy (Democratic Party), former United States Secretary of Agriculture and former U.S. Representative
Cindy Hyde-Smith (Republican Party), incumbent U.S. Senator and former Mississippi Commissioner of Agriculture and Commerce
Chris McDaniel (Republican Party), state senator and candidate for the U.S. Senate in 2014

Declined
 Jeramey Anderson, state representative (running for MS-4) (Democratic Party)
 David Baria, Mississippi House of Representatives Minority Leader (running for Class 1 U.S. Senate seat) (Democratic Party)
 Phil Bryant, Governor of Mississippi (Republican Party)
 Jamie Franks, chairman of the Lee County Democratic Party and former state representative (Democratic Party)
 Andy Taggart, former chief of staff to former governor Kirk Fordice (Republican Party)

Withdrawn
 Jason Shelton, Mayor of Tupelo (Democratic Party)

General election

Endorsements

Fundraising

Polling
Graphical summary

Results

Runoff
During the run-off campaign, while appearing with cattle rancher Colin Hutchinson in Tupelo, Mississippi, Hyde-Smith said, "If he invited me to a public hanging, I'd be in the front row." Hyde-Smith's comment immediately drew harsh criticism, given Mississippi's notorious history of lynchings of African-Americans. In response to the criticism, Hyde-Smith downplayed her comment as "an exaggerated expression of regard" and characterized the backlash as "ridiculous."

Hyde-Smith joined Mississippi Governor Phil Bryant at a news conference in Jackson, Mississippi on November 12, 2018, where she was asked repeatedly about her comment by reporters. In the footage, Hyde-Smith adamantly refused to provide any substantive answer to reporters' questions, responding on five occasions with variations of, "I put out a statement yesterday, and that's all I'm gonna say about it." When reporters redirected questions to Bryant, he defended Hyde-Smith's comment, and changed the subject to abortion, saying he was "confused about where the outrage is at about 20 million African American children that have been aborted."

On November 15, 2018, Hyde-Smith appeared in a video clip saying that it would be "a great idea" to make it more difficult for liberals to vote. Her campaign stated that Hyde-Smith was making an obvious joke, and the video was selectively edited. Both this and the "public hanging" video were released by Lamar White Jr., a Louisiana blogger and journalist. Attention was also drawn to photographs, posted on Facebook four years earlier, of Hyde-Smith and her husband visiting former Confederate President Jefferson Davis' home, a historic site. The photos show her wearing a Confederate hat and posing with a rifle commonly used by Confederate soldiers.

Predictions

Polling
Graphical summary

with Chris McDaniel and Mike Espy

Results

References

External links
 Candidates at Vote Smart 
 Candidates at Ballotpedia 
 Campaign finance at FEC 
 Campaign finance at OpenSecrets

Official campaign websites
 Mike Espy for Senate
 Cindy Hyde-Smith for Senate

Mississippi 2018
2018 special
Mississippi special
Mississippi 2018
United States Senate special
United States Senate 2018